The 2018–19 NBL season was the 20th season for the Cairns Taipans in the National Basketball League (NBL).

Roster

Depth chart

Pre-season 
As part of their pre-season, the Taipans played eight pre-season games. Their first game was held in Cairns against Drexel University, the second in Rockhampton against the Brisbane Bullets and the following two games were against Melbourne United. As a club in the NBL they also took part in the NBL Blitz, and played games against the Sydney Kings, the Perth Wildcats and the New Zealand Breakers, however they opted out of the NBLxNBA games. To finish their pre-season they played a final game in Adelaide against the Adelaide 36ers.

Game log 

|- style="background-color:#ccffcc;"
| 1
| 23 August
| Drexel University
| W 92-76
| Not announced
| Not announced
| Not announced
| Early Settler Stadium 
| 1-0
|- style="background-color:#ccffcc;"
| 2
| 31 August
| @ Brisbane
| W 74-95
| Not announced
| Not announced
| Not announced
| CQUniversity Community Sports Centre
| 2-0
|- style="background-color:#ffcccc;"
| 3
| 11 September
| @ Melbourne
| L 89-88
| Melo Trimble (19)
| Nate Jawai (6)
| Melo Trimble (6)
| Dandenong Basketball Stadium
| 2-1
|- style="background-color:#ccffcc;"
| 4
| 13 September
| @ Melbourne
| W 75-78
| Not announced
| Not announced
| Not announced
| Melbourne Sports and Aquatic Centre
| 3-1

|- style="background-color:#ffcccc;"
| 1
| 20 September
| Sydney
| L 75-60
| Devon Hall (20)
| Devon Hall (9)
| D. J. Newbill (3)
| Bendigo Stadium
| 3-2
|- style="background-color:#ffcccc;"
| 2
| 22 September
| Perth
| L 78-99
| Melo Trimble (17)
| Devon Hall (7)
| Rob Loe, D. J. Newbill (3)
| Ballarat Minerdome
| 3-3
|- style="background-color:#ccffcc;"
| 3
| 23 September
| New Zealand
| W 89-96
| D. J. Newbill (24)
| Kuany Kuany (6)
| D. J. Newbill, Melo Trimble (5)
| Ballarat Minerdome
| 4-3

|- style="background-color:#ffcccc;"
| 5
| 25 September
| @ Adelaide
| L 99-75
| Not announced
| Not announced
| Not announced
| Titanium Security Arena
| 4-4

Regular season 
The regular season of the NBL consists of 28 games, with the Taipans' 14 home games to be played at the Cairns Convention Centre.

Standings 

The NBL tie-breaker system as outlined in the NBL Rules and Regulations states that in the case of an identical win-loss record, the overall points percentage between the teams will determine order of seeding.

1Perth Wildcats won on overall points percentage. Melbourne United finished 2nd on overall points percentage. 

2Brisbane Bullets won on overall points percentage. 

3New Zealand Breakers won on overall points percentage.

Game log 

|- style="background-color:#ccffcc;"
| 1
| 13 October
| @ Brisbane
| W 70-88
| Melo Trimble (32)
| D. J. Newbill (10)
| Devon Hall (6)
| Brisbane Convention and Exhibition Centre 
| 1-0
|- style="background-color:#ffcccc;"
| 2
| 21 October
| Illawarra
| L 93-104
| Melo Trimble (28)
| Mitchell Young (7)
| D. J. Newbill (7)
| Cairns Convention Centre
| 1-1
|- style="background-color:#ffcccc;"
| 3
| 26 October
| Adelaide
| L 83-91
| Dexter Kernich-Drew (17)
| Nate Jawai (9)
| Dexter Kernich-Drew, Melo Trimble, Jarrod Kenny (3)
| Cairns Convention Centre
| 1-2
|- style="background-color:#ffcccc;"
| 4
| 28 October
| @ Sydney
| L 98-90
| Melo Trimble (29)
| D. J. Newbill (10)
| Melo Trimble (8)
| Qudos Bank Arena
| 1-3

|- style="background-color:#ffcccc;"
| 5
| 3 November
| Melbourne
| L 85-98
| Melo Trimble (34)
| D. J. Newbill (9)
| Melo Trimble (8)
| Cairns Convention Centre 
| 1-4
|- style="background-color:#ffcccc;"
| 6
| 9 November
| @ New Zealand
| L 104-81
| Melo Trimble (23)
| Kuany Kuany, Rob Loe (6)
| Melo Trimble (3)
| Cairns Convention Centre
| 1-5
|- style="background-color:#ffcccc;"
| 7
| 11 November
| @ Melbourne
| L 87-80
| Melo Trimble (19)
| Nate Jawai (10)
| Melo Trimble, Jarrod Kenny (4)
| Melbourne Arena
| 1-6
|- style="background-color:#ffcccc;"
| 8
| 17 November
| Perth
| L 83-99
| Melo Trimble, Devon Hall (18)
| Melo Trimble (12)
| Melo Trimble (7)
| Cairns Convention Centre
| 1-7
|- style="background-color:#ffcccc;"
| 9
| 23 November
| @ Adelaide
| L 109-95
| Melo Trimble (23)
| Rob Loe (6)
| Devon Hall (6)
| Titanium Security Arena
| 1-8

|- style="background-color:#ffcccc;"
| 10
| 7 December
| Illawarra
| L 84-95
| D. J. Newbill (21)
| Devon Hall (9)
| Melo Trimble, Nate Jawai (5)
| Cairns Convention Centre 
| 1-9
|- style="background-color:#ffcccc;"
| 11
| 9 December
| @ Perth
| L 94-72
| D. J. Newbill (17)
| Nate Jawai (9)
| D. J. Newbill (4)
| RAC Arena
| 1-10
|- style="background-color:#ffcccc;"
| 12
| 16 December
| New Zealand
| L 78-89
| Melo Trimble (23)
| Nate Jawai (9)
| Melo Trimble (6)
| Cairns Convention Centre
| 1-11
|- style="background-color:#ffcccc;"
| 13
| 20 December
| Sydney
| L 70-81
| Melo Trimble (14)
| Nate Jawai (8)
| Melo Trimble (7)
| Cairns Convention Centre
| 1-12
|- style="background-color:#ffcccc;"
| 14
| 22 December
| @ Adelaide
| L 87-82
| Melo Trimble, Nate Jawai (18)
| Nate Jawai (9)
| Melo Trimble (6)
| Titanium Security Arena
| 1-13
|- style="background-color:#ffcccc;"
| 15
| 31 December
| Perth
| L 78-93
| Melo Trimble (14)
| Lucas Walker, Rob Loe (6)
| Melo Trimble (4)
| Cairns Convention Centre
| 1-14

|- style="background-color:#ccffcc;"
| 16
| 3 January
| Brisbane
| W 109-80
| Devon Hall (24)
| Lucas Walker (8)
| Devon Hall, D. J. Newbill (6)
| Cairns Convention Centre 
| 2-14
|- style="background-color:#ffcccc;"
| 17
| 7 January
| Sydney
| L 82-86
| Melo Trimble (22)
| D. J. Newbill (9)
| Nate Jawai (7)
| Cairns Convention Centre
| 2-15
|- style="background-color:#ccffcc;"
| 18
| 11 January
| @ Perth
| W 79-81
| Melo Trimble (32)
| Nate Jawai, Lucas Walker (8)
| Nate Jawai (5)
| RAC Arena
| 3-15
|- style="background-color:#ffcccc;"
| 19
| 13 January
| Melbourne
| L 89-99
| Melo Trimble (42)
| Alex Loughton (8)
| Melo Trimble, Devon Hall (2)
| Cairns Convention Centre
| 3-16
|- style="background-color:#ffcccc;"
| 20
| 19 January
| @ Brisbane
| L 99-68
| Melo Trimble (23)
| Rob Loe (7)
| Devon Hall (3)
| Brisbane Convention and Exhibition Centre
| 3-17
|- style="background-color:#ccffcc;"
| 21
| 21 January
| New Zealand
| W 106-98
| Melo Trimble (32)
| Lucas Walker (8)
| Melo Trimble, Rob Loe (5)
| Cairns Convention Centre
| 4-17
|- style="background-color:#ffcccc;"
| 22
| 24 January
| @ New Zealand
| L 113-106
| D. J. Newbill (32)
| Lucas Walker (9)
| Melo Trimble (6)
| TSB Stadium 
| 4-18
|- style="background-color:#ffcccc;"
| 23
| 26 January
| @ Illawarra
| L 82-81
| Melo Trimble (24)
| Alex Loughton (8)
| D. J. Newbill (5)
| WIN Entertainment Centre 
| 4-19

|- style="background-color:#ffcccc;"
| 24
| 2 February
| Adelaide
| L 91-100
| Melo Trimble (21)
| Devon Hall, Fabijan Krslovic (7)
| Melo Trimble (4)
| Cairns Convention Centre 
| 4-20
|- style="background-color:#ffcccc;"
| 25
| 4 February
| @ Illawarra
| L 110-95
| D. J. Newbill (20)
| Lucas Walker, Rob Loe (8)
| Melo Trimble (11)
| WIN Entertainment Centre
| 4-21
|- style="background-color:#ccffcc;"
| 26
| 9 February
| Brisbane
| W 79-68
| Melo Trimble (23)
| Jarrod Kenny (7)
| Devon Hall (5)
| Cairns Convention Centre
| 5-21
|- style="background-color:#ccffcc;"
| 27
| 14 February
| @ Melbourne
| W 85-87
| Melo Trimble (21)
| Rob Loe (10)
| Melo Trimble (9)
| Melbourne Arena
| 6-21
|- style="background-color:#ffcccc;"
| 28
| 16 February
| @ Sydney
| L 89-84
| Melo Trimble (21)
| Melo Trimble (8)
| Melo Trimble (5)
| Qudos Bank Arena
| 6-22

Player statistics 
Updated: 1/9/2019

Awards

Most Valuable Player 
Melo Trimble - "Melo Trimble was the clear choice for Taipans MVP this year, after breaking numerous club records and becoming the first player in over a decade to have at least 600 points, 100 rebounds, 100 assists and 50 made three-pointers in a regular season. The first-year import was also second in the NBL in scoring (22.6 points per game) third in assists (4.5 per game) seventh in three-pointers (43.1 per cent) and tied sixth for steals (1.2 per game)."

Coaches Award 
Jarrod Kenny - "Selected by the coaches, the recipient of this award fulfils a variety of factors that they determine, whether that is the traits and values they bring to the team, their on-court efforts or their off-court contributions. This year, Jarrod Kenny was presented with the Coaches Award for bringing a competitive mentality and work ethic to training every day, while on game night he was consistently ready and was available to fill any role the team needed. Kenny is one of two players rostered for next season and alongside Rob Loe will return in the 2019/20 NBL season."

Best Defensive Player 
D. J. Newbill - "DJ Newbill has been named Best Defensive Player by his club for two straight seasons now, after winning the same award with the New Zealand Breakers last year. Newbill often had the task of stopping some of the most lethal scorers the NBL, and proved to be a problem for opposition teams with his basketball IQ, strength, energy and quick hands. Newbill was also tied sixth in the NBL for steals, averaging 1.2 per game."

Member's Choice MVP 
Melo Trimble - "As one of the many benefits of being a Taipans member, the Orange Army get the privilege for voting for their very own MVP and ensuring their favourite player gets recognised at the end of the season. Melo Trimble took out the Member's Choice MVP Award within an hour of voting being open, and the American gained the majority of votes from the 2018-19 Taipans members by a landslide."

Player's Player 
Kuany Kuany - "Voted on by the playing group, each player confidentially provided a 3-2-1 vote for the best team mate throughout the season, with Kuany Kuany taking out the honour this season. Kuany is known for being the first to put his hand up to help, sticking to the team values, and always going the extra mile for his peers. His great attitude and warmth has made him a huge fan favourite in Cairns, with his outgoing personality and infectious energy a constant source of positivity for the Taipans."

Club Person of the Year 
Anthony Fisher - "Previously awarded to a volunteer, part-time member of staff or external individual that contributes to the Taipans, Anthony Fisher became the first player to ever be named Club Person of the Year on Friday. As a training player, he was an integral part of the Taipans training squad throughout the 2018-19 season, focusing on improving his game and his team mates. He has also been recognised for actively engaged in the Cairns community through Taipans promotions, school visits and clinics at Cairns Basketball."

Commitment to Community 
Nathan Jawai - "While all Taipans players and staff deliver a number of appearances, engagements and activities in the Cairns community, the Commitment to Community Award is presented to the player that goes above and beyond their Taipans duty. Nate Jawai took out this award for the second year in a row, thanks to his ongoing efforts with the Taipans Indigenous Program and Queensland Government commitments. Jawai continues to be a superstar in the local community and is extremely passionate about the work he conducts as an Indigenous role model."

See also 

 2018–19 NBL season
 Cairns Taipans

References

External links 

 Official Website

2018–19 NBL season by team
2018–19 NBL season
Cairns Taipans seasons
Cairns Taipans